Aphonopelma mojave is a species of spider, in the family Theraphosidae (tarantulas).

It is native to the Mojave Desert in Southern California, United States.

References

mojave
Spiders of the United States
Fauna of the Mojave Desert
Endemic fauna of California
Spiders described in 1997
Fauna without expected TNC conservation status